Josh Turner (born 23 September 1995) is an Australian rugby sevens player.

Turner was a member of the Australian men's rugby seven's squad at the Tokyo 2020 Olympics. The team came third in their pool round and then lost to Fiji 19-0 in the quarterfinal.

Turner competed for Australia at the 2022 Rugby World Cup Sevens in Cape Town.

References

External links
 

1995 births
Living people
Male rugby sevens players
Olympic rugby sevens players of Australia
Rugby sevens players at the 2020 Summer Olympics
Place of birth missing (living people)
Rugby sevens players at the 2022 Commonwealth Games